Magreanops is a phacopid trilobite in the family Phacopidae. The type species is Magreanops renateae and the genus also includes Magreanops monachus, both described from the Frasnian-aged Bovesse Formation.
and Moulin Liénaux Formations in Belgium during 2018.

References

Fossil taxa described in 2018
Phacopidae
Late Devonian animals
Late Devonian first appearances
Late Devonian extinctions